Mirabaud is an international banking and financial group based in Geneva, Switzerland. Founded in 1819, it gradually developed into the third largest private bank in the city.

Six partners are involved in the group's day-to-day management. Mirabaud provides services in wealth management, asset management and brokerage to private clients and institutions around the world.

History

Mirabaud et Cie was founded in 1819 and is one of the oldest banks in Switzerland. Family-owned and operated, the bank has played a key part in the construction and development of the Swiss financial system, helping co-found the Geneva Stock Exchange in 1857.

In 1973, it pioneered the development of Swiss hedge funds. In 1985, Mirabaud opened its first foreign bureau in Montréal, followed in 1990 by the reinforcement of its historical presence in London 

The first Asian office was opened in Hong Kong in 1997 and one year later, the bank reinforced its presence in Switzerland by opening its first subsidiary in Zurich.

In 2001, Mirabaud significantly grows its asset management teams in Geneva and London. The same year, the Group creates LPP Gestion SA  to operate in the field of liability management services for pension funds. 

From 2003 onwards the Group continues to solidify its presence in the EU, Switzerland, and the Middle East: a new subsidiary opens in Paris, a majority stake in Jenni & Cie (Basel) is purchased in 2004, and another banking office opens in Dubai in 2007. 

In 2010, the Group acquires Venture Finanzas in Spain and pursues its strategic implantation by opening offices in Madrid, Barcelona, Valencia and Seville.

In 2011, Mirabaud consolidates its asset management activities in Luxembourg by creating Mirabaud Asset Management (Europe) SA. A bank (Mirabaud & Cie (Europe) SA) follows in 2014. In 2015, the Group announces the acquisition of two further banking licenses in Spain and France.

The group undergoes a major structural change in 2014: Mirabaud's activities become integrated into Mirabaud SCA, a Swiss corporate partnership. For the first time the Groupe also publishes its annual results.

Activities

Mirabaud’s headquarters are located in Geneva, Switzerland, but the Group has offices around the world. These include subsidiaries in Switzerland (Geneva, Basel, Zurich), Europe (London, Luxembourg, Paris, Madrid, Barcelona, Valencia, Seville and Milan), and elsewhere around the globe (Montreal, Hong Kong, and Dubai amongst others. The Group concentrates on three main divisions: wealth management, asset management, and brokerage.

Sponsorship

Mirabaud is since 2005 the main sponsor of the Bol d’Or Mirabaud – the longest fresh water sailboat regatta in Europe that is held annually on Lake Geneva. In 2019, to celebrate its 200th anniversary the bank made the Geneva Museum of Modern Arts free to all visitors.

References

External links 
 

Banks of Switzerland
Banks established in 1819
Companies based in Geneva
Private banks